Elleben is a municipality in the district Ilm-Kreis, in Thuringia, Germany. Elleben has two named communities, Riechheim and Gügleben.

History
Within the German Empire (1871-1918), Elleben was part of the Principality of Schwarzburg-Sondershausen, while Riechheim and Gügleben were part of the Duchy of Saxe-Meiningen.

References

Municipalities in Thuringia
Ilm-Kreis
Schwarzburg-Sondershausen
Duchy of Saxe-Meiningen